Patrick Erouart-Siad, real name Patrick Erouart (born 16 January 1955, Savigny-sur-Orge) is a French writer.

Biography 
Born of a French father and a Somali mother of Djibouti, he spent his early years in Djibouti, then returned to France in the Paris region, spent two years in Madagascar and four years in Senegal before traveling around the world.

He was a resident of the Villa Médicis from 1989 to 1991, and has been living in New York city since 1996.

He works with director Jacques Sarasin on a DVD and a film about Joseph Stiglitz. He has collaborated with magazines Géo, Corto Maltese, Actuel, Cent idées, Vogue, l'Écho des savanes, etc.

He was a journalist and proofreader for Libération (1979–1984).

Works 
1965: Cahier de poésies
1985: Afrique du Sud : « Blanc honoraire », Ramsay
1987: Cahiers de la Mort-Colibri, novel, Éditions du Seuil
1988: East Africa with Tim beddow
1992: Océanie, prix Ève Delacroix of the Académie française.
1995: La Guinée-Bissau aujourd'hui, 2nd ed.
1997: Le fleuve Powhatan, novel, Flammarion
1991: Djibouti with Patrick Frilet
2002: Une Enfance Outremer under the direction of Leilla Sebbar, Points Seuil
2001: Autour de Nicolas Bouvier, 
2006: L'appel du Bronx with father Pierre Raphaël
2007: Maroc

Articles 
2006: Chroniques in "French Morning" online magazine de New York
2005–2004: Articles for EchoPolyglot.com
2004: Guide de New York National Geographic Magazine de NYU
2004: Black Renaissance The Great Wall
2002: Special issue on New York by Geo 
2002: Report in Somaliland with illustrations by the author

Television 
1994: 52 minutes documentary, Sauvé des eaux, a hydroelectric dam in the Guyanese forest o fPetit Saut, prod. Gedeon

References

External links
 « Skirting the issue: French literature out of touch with social realities » (article by Patrick Erouart-Siad in the Boston Review)
 Patrick Erouart-Siad on Radio France Internationale
 Publications by Patrick Erouart-Siad on CAIRN
 Patrick EROUART-SIAD et le parcours de Noé N'Diaye on Maghress

20th-century French non-fiction writers
21st-century French non-fiction writers
1955 births
People from Savigny-sur-Orge
Living people